Seyi Akinwunmi is the first Vice President of the Nigeria Football Federation. He was appointed Vice President of the Nigeria Football Federation (NFF) in 2014 and re-elected in 2018. He is Chairman of the Lagos State Football Association. In 2012, he served on the adhoc committee for restructuring the Nigeria National League.

Controversy

Lesbian Speech 
On 13 June 2016, during an interview by news agencies, allegedly blamed lesbianism in the non-advancement of women in sports in Nigeria. In his statement "Lesbianism kills teams. People are afraid to talk about it. The coaches take advantage of the girls, so there is much more to build in female football. Last year, I think the most problematic person to the chairman of female league was Seyi Akinwunmi, I launched several attacks just to ensure things worked accordingly. So, I decided that look, if it’s so difficult for you, let us show you how it’s done."

References 

Living people
Nigerian football chairmen and investors
Year of birth missing (living people)